Viola Bauer (born 13 December 1976 in Annaberg-Buchholz, Saxony, East Germany) is a retired German cross-country skier who competed from 1995 to 2007. She has won a complete set of medals at the Winter Olympics with a gold (2002) and a silver (2006) in the 4 × 5 km relay, and a bronze in the 5 km + 5 km combined pursuit (2002).

Bauer also has a complete set of 4 × 5 km relay medals at the FIS Nordic World Ski Championships with a gold in 2003, a silver in 2007, and a bronze in 1999. Her best individual finish at the World Championships was sixth in the Individual sprint event in 2005.

Bauer had eleven individual wins at various levels from 1998 to 2007. She retired following the 2006-07 World Cup season. She now works as a commentator for Eurosport.

Cross-country skiing results
All results are sourced from the International Ski Federation (FIS).

Olympic Games
 3 medals – (1 gold, 1 silver, 1 bronze)

World Championships
 3 medals – (1 gold, 1 silver, 1 bronze)

a.  Cancelled due to extremely cold weather.

World Cup

Season standings

Individual podiums
 1 podium

Team podiums
 5 victories – (4 , 1 ) 
 11 podiums – (9 , 2 )

References

External links
 
 
 
  

1976 births
Living people
People from Annaberg-Buchholz
German female cross-country skiers
Cross-country skiers at the 2006 Winter Olympics
Cross-country skiers at the 2002 Winter Olympics
Olympic gold medalists for Germany
Olympic silver medalists for Germany
Olympic bronze medalists for Germany
Olympic cross-country skiers of Germany
Olympic medalists in cross-country skiing
FIS Nordic World Ski Championships medalists in cross-country skiing
Medalists at the 2006 Winter Olympics
Medalists at the 2002 Winter Olympics
Sportspeople from Saxony